Pantteri (Finnish for "panther"), sold in Sweden as Katten (Swedish: "Cat"), is a brand of Finnish salmiakki candy, made by Fazer.

History
Pantteri candies were first invented in 1965 as small, black salmiakki and liquorice gum drops in a typical cardboard candy box, with a picture of a panther on the box cover. A sugar coating was later added to the drops, slightly altering their taste.

The most famous form of Pantteri, however, is the larger, sugar coated disc-shaped candies sold in a plastic bag, also with a picture of a panther on it. At first only salmiakki Pantteri candies were available, but in the 1990s Fazer introduced a fruit-flavoured version of Pantteri, "Pantteri Mix" (containing red, yellow and green fruit candies and normal salmiakki candies).

In the 2000s, the Pantteri drops sold in boxes were reverted to the original 1965 version, without the sugar coating. The text on the box says "Original Pantteri drops from 1965".

Later additions include "Lumipantteri Mix" (Finnish for "snow panther") in summer 2006, "Pantteri Mix" candies with white coating, "Musta Pantteri" (Finnish for "black panther"), which has a slightly higher ammonium chloride content than the regular salmiakki Pantteri, and "Pantteri Black Shot", candies with a salty liquorice filling.

Discontinued variations include "Yöpantteri Mix" ("night panther") featuring fruit and salmiakki candies, shaped like panthers, stars and moons and "Rock Pantteri Mix", containing many different salty liquorice and fruit candies.

Visible advertising campaigns are an important part of Pantteri's publicity image. They were awarded as best advertising campaign in Finland twice, in 1999 and 2000. One advertising campaign featured a fictional Latino character called "El Pantero", sporting advertising slogans in mock Spanish such as "El Pantero baila" and "Baila y come". The current advertising campaign promotes "Panthóur", a humorous variation of the popular parkour sport.

Pantteri products

Finland 
 Original Pantteri drops with a salty liquorice flavor
 Salty liquorice flavored, bigger Pantteri candies
 Musta Pantteri with a stronger salty liquorice flavor than the normal Pantteri candy 
 Pantteri Mix, a mix of salty liquorice and fruit candies
 Small tar-flavored Pantteri drops
 Lumipantteri Mix, salty liquorice and fruit candies with a white coating
 Pantteri Black Shot, filled salty liquorice candies
 Pantteri Black & White, salty liquorice candies and smaller Lumipantteri fruit candies
 a salty liquorice and vanilla flavored Pantteri ice cream cone made by Pingviini (Nestlé)
 Xylitol Pantteri, salty liquorice candies sweetened with xylitol instead of sugar (discontinued)
 Small Pantteri drops with a sugar coating (discontinued)
 Small sugar coated Pantteri drops with salty liquorice, fruit and cola candies (discontinued)
 Musta Pantteri Mix, with the original Musta Pantteri and also salty liquorice candies shaped like eyes and paws (discontinued)
 a salty liquorice flavored Pantteri ice pop made by Valiojäätelö (discontinued)
 Pantteri Duo with salty liquorice and exotic fruit candies (discontinued)
 Yöpantteri Mix, a mix of fruit and salty liquorice candies shaped like panthers, stars and moons (discontinued)
 Pantteri Tassut, small salty liquorice and fruit candies shaped like paws (discontinued)
 Rock Pantteri Mix, a mix of fruit and salty liquorice candies (discontinued)
 Pantteri Street, a mix of liquorice, salty liquorice and fruit candies in different shapes (discontinued)
 Pantteri Jungle Mix, of Blood orange-menthol, salmiak-licorice-menthol and salmiak-menthol.

Sweden (Katten) 
 Salta katten (similar to the Pantteri Tassut salty liquorice candies)
 Söta katten (similar to Pantteri Mix)
 Vinterkatten (similar to Lumipantteri Mix)
 Salta katten, small drops shaped like a cat's head (previously known as Salta lakritsfigurer)
 Natt katten (similar to Yöpantteri Mix)

See also
Fazer
 List of confectionery brands
Tyrkisk Peber

External links
 

Brand name confectionery
Products introduced in 1965
Finnish confectionery
Liquorice (confectionery)
Fazer